Westport is a town in the West Coast region of the South Island of New Zealand. Established in 1861, it is the oldest European settlement on the West Coast. Originally named Buller, it is on the right bank and at the mouth of the Buller River, close by the prominent headland of Cape Foulwind. It is connected via State Highway 6 with Greymouth,  to the south, and with Nelson  in the northeast, via the Buller Gorge.

Name 
The Māori language name for the river and the region is Kawatiri, meaning deep and swift. The town is thought to have been named after Westport, County Mayo in Ireland, although the choice of name was no doubt also guided by its location.

History
From an archaeological excavation site, near the mouth of the Buller River (Kawatiri), it is clear that Māori were living close to Westport by the early 14th century. Māori mostly lived in coastal areas, though they explored the mountains for pounamu (jade or greenstone), which they then traded with other iwi.

The first wave of European settlers came to Westport in 1861 as gold miners, and the first European vessel said to have entered the river was the sealing schooner Three Brothers in 1844, though other sealing vessels were recorded in the Cape Foulwind area in the 1820s. The 1880s saw many exploratory parties of geologists and surveyors combing the area for the presence of valuable resources and taking the measure of the land. Amongst them were Charles Heaphy, William Fox and Thomas Brunner. While gold brought initial interest to the area, and for example, led to large areas of the coastal areas (covered by sediment from the river) being dredged for the valuable mineral, the area soon became much more famous for coal mining, still a dominant concern in the region today.

A coal mining company was formed in 1878 called the Westport Colliery Company Ltd, and then became The Westport Coal Company in 1881 when a group of Dunedin businessmen purchased the mines. The coal fields were at Coalbrookdale (Denniston) and Granity Creek (Millerton) and coal was transported to the Westport harbour to be shipped out. By 1905 The Westport Coal Company was New Zealand’s largest coal producer.

Westport was administrated as part of the Nelson Province from 1853 to 1876.

Westport has been damaged by several earthquakes, the worst the 1929 Murchison earthquake, in which several buildings collapsed, including the post office tower. The town now has a number of Art Deco buildings that were constructed after the earthquake, for example the Clock Tower Chambers.

Flooding
Westport and the Buller District have had several floods since 1846. In January 1868, heavy rain led to flooding, which destroyed two wharves. The town was flooded again in October and November 1926, and yet again in 1970, 2012, and 2015. In 2018, Westport was damaged by Cyclone Fehi during the 2017–18 South Pacific cyclone season. According to Land River Sea Consulting founder and river engineer Matthew Gardner, Westport is sited on a flood-prone catchment and climate change is causing water levels to rise.  A West Coast Regional Council spokesperson expressed concern about the under-investment in flood protection including dredging and river management work in Westport. 
   
In July 2021, wet weather throughout New Zealand caused more flooding, leading to the evacuation of about 2,000 people, roughly half of the town's 4,600 residents. The flood caused millions of dollars in damages and damaged hundreds of homes in Westport. 563 homes were damaged with 70 homes being red stickered and 393 homes being yellow stickered. 23% of the town's 983 dwellings required repairs. By mid-October 2021, 450 homes remained uninhabitable or damaged. 140 remained in temporary accommodation including cabins, motels, or relatives' homes.

In February 2022, Westport and the Buller District had heavy rain and significant flooding, which damaged homes, infrastructure, farms, and roads. Residents were also evacuated. On 10 February, a state of emergency was declared in the Buller District. Minister of Rural Affairs Damien O'Connor described the February flooding in Westport as "one of the worst he had seen" and attributed it to climate change. On 23 February, Prime Minister Jacinda Ardern announced a NZ$500,000 scheme to assist farmers in Westport and the wider West Coast region with flood damage called "Task Force Green." 

In July 2022, Stuff reported that over 400 homes in Westport had not been fully repaired since the floods that struck the city in July 2021. Of the 563 flood damaged homes, just over 100 had fully completed their repairs. The Buller District Council and the West Coast Regional Council submitted a NZ$54 million business case for the region which includes investing in flood walls, subsidising people to move from flood-prone areas, and investing in Westport's stormwater system.

Geography

Climate

The Westport climate is strongly influenced by the high amount of precipitation from the Tasman Sea, with all months being rather wet on average. Despite very high annual rainfall, Westport is often prone to drought and conservation measures are sometimes triggered. While colder than the more northern parts of New Zealand, average temperature changes over the year are not extreme.

Demographics

Westport, comprising the statistical areas of Westport North and Westport South, had a population of 4,389 at the 2018 New Zealand census, a decrease of 366 people (-7.7%) since the 2013 census, and a decrease of 120 people (-2.7%) since the 2006 census. There were 1,998 households. There were 2,214 males and 2,172 females, giving a sex ratio of 1.02 males per female, with 729 people (16.6%) aged under 15 years, 651 (14.8%) aged 15 to 29, 1,911 (43.5%) aged 30 to 64, and 1,092 (24.9%) aged 65 or older.

Ethnicities were 91.9% European/Pākehā, 12.1% Māori, 1.8% Pacific peoples, 2.7% Asian, and 1.6% other ethnicities (totals add to more than 100% since people could identify with multiple ethnicities).

The proportion of people born overseas was 9.2%, compared with 27.1% nationally.

Although some people objected to giving their religion, 56.3% had no religion, 33.6% were Christian, 0.5% were Hindu, 0.1% were Muslim, 0.3% were Buddhist and 1.8% had other religions.

Of those at least 15 years old, 303 (8.3%) people had a bachelor or higher degree, and 1,179 (32.2%) people had no formal qualifications. The employment status of those at least 15 was that 1,398 (38.2%) people were employed full-time, 561 (15.3%) were part-time, and 159 (4.3%) were unemployed.

Rural surrounds

Westport Rural had a population of 1,260 at the 2018 New Zealand census, an increase of 30 people (2.4%) since the 2013 census, and an increase of 285 people (29.2%) since the 2006 census. There were 498 households. There were 624 males and 639 females, giving a sex ratio of 0.98 males per female. The median age was 50.1 years (compared with 37.4 years nationally), with 249 people (19.8%) aged under 15 years, 96 (7.6%) aged 15 to 29, 606 (48.1%) aged 30 to 64, and 306 (24.3%) aged 65 or older.

Ethnicities were 94.0% European/Pākehā, 8.8% Māori, 0.7% Pacific peoples, 1.7% Asian, and 2.1% other ethnicities (totals add to more than 100% since people could identify with multiple ethnicities).

The proportion of people born overseas was 9.0%, compared with 27.1% nationally.

Although some people objected to giving their religion, 55.7% had no religion, 32.9% were Christian, 0.5% were Hindu, 0.5% were Buddhist and 1.9% had other religions.

Of those at least 15 years old, 129 (12.8%) people had a bachelor or higher degree, and 285 (28.2%) people had no formal qualifications. The median income was $24,900, compared with $31,800 nationally. The employment status of those at least 15 was that 441 (43.6%) people were employed full-time, 192 (19.0%) were part-time, and 21 (2.1%) were unemployed.

Economy

Economic activity is based around fishing, coal mining and dairy farming. Historically, gold mining was a major industry, and coal mining was much more extensive than today (especially in terms of employment numbers). However, the region still is home to New Zealand's largest opencast mining operation in Stockton. Some native forest logging occurred in the area until cessation around 1999.

The Holcim company had a large cement plant in the southwest side of town until its closure on 30 June 2016.

Westport is also home to EPIC Westport an innovation hub, which houses software developers and business startups.

Media

A daily local newspaper is published in Westport, the Westport News. The Westport News building also houses coast-wide local radio station Coast FM.

Tourism

Tourist attracts in the area include Cape Foulwind, Tauranga Bay with its large fur seal colony, and fine surfing beaches.   The opening of the Old Ghost Road which runs between Lyell and Seddonville to the north of Westport has seen an explosion in the number of mountain bikers visiting the area. The Kawatiri Coastal Trail is under development between Westport, Carters Beach, Cape Foulwind, and Charleston.The Pūwaha Section of the trail from Westport to Carters Beach was the first of nine sections to be built. It was officially opened on 6 December 2020. The remaining sections are expected to be completed by June 2022.

Rafting and jetboating in the Buller Gorge are popular. Westport is a base for trips to Karamea and the Oparara Basin Arches with the only road access to the area running north from Westport. Paparoa National Park is also located nearby.

Transport

Westport is served by State Highway 67, and the 8.9 km spur State Highway 67A to Carters Beach and Cape Foulwind which terminates at the former Holcim cement plant location.

The Holcim company managed the day-to-day operations of Westport's port until ceasing operations in the district, using it to ship their cement product to market, for example to the Port of Onehunga in Auckland.

The first railway of the area in 1864 ran from Westport  to the coal fields, most of them north of town. The first section of railway from Westport to Fairdown via Sergeants Hill opened on 31 December 1875; this line ultimately reached Seddonville in 1895 and was known as the Seddonville Branch. From this beginning, an isolated network of branch lines was developed: a Westport-Inangahua branch line of about 12 miles (19 km) was authorised by the Railways Authorisation Act, 1904. But the lines were not linked to the national network until the completion of the Stillwater–Westport Line through the Buller Gorge in 1942.

Westport Airport is a small airport. It was formerly served twice daily on weekdays and daily in the weekend by Air New Zealand from Wellington, and prior to that, flights to Christchurch and Hokitika were also operated. The Air New Zealand service from Wellington service ceased in April 2015 and its place was taken by Sounds Air.

Facilities

The town used to have one cinema/theatre, the St James Theatre, able to seat 424 patrons for film screenings, theatre productions or other activities. After being found structurally unsound, the theatre had to be demolished. A new theatre has since opened. The NBS theatre has two movie theatres, one which seats 55 people and a boutique theatre that seats approximately 20 people. This theatre also has a large facility with seating for approximately 370 people and a stage for performing.

The township also has a links-style, 18-hole, par-72 golf course.

The Pulse Energy Recreation Centre (originally named the Solid Energy Centre), a sports complex, was opened on 18 April 2009.

Te Taha o Te Awa Marae is based at Westport. It is a marae (tribal meeting ground) of Ngāti Apa ki te Rā Tō and its Pūaha Te Rangi hapū, and includes a wharenui (meeting house), also called Te Taha o te Awa.

The Coaltown Museum, opened in 2013, illustrates the area's local history. 

Sue Thomson Casey Memorial Library, Buller District's library, is located on Palmerston Street.

Education

The school celebrated its 75th anniversary in 1997 but also claims to have been operating for over 100 years, due to its connection to earlier secondary schooling in the district.

The schools were founded in 1942 and 1941

It is a state integrated Catholic school and has operated since at least 1882.

All these schools are coeducational. The town's primary schools all have a decile rating of 4, and Buller High School has a decile rating of 3. School rolls are as of

Notable people 

 Ben Blair – rugby union player
 James Colvin – politician
 G. F. J. Dart – educationalist, playwright
 Alan Deere – World War II fighter ace
 Anna Harrison – netball player
 Peter Hawes – playwright, author, actor
 Laura Suisted – journalist

Notable buildings

References

External links

 Westport Tourism Website (Official Westport tourism website, Tourism New Zealand)
 Buller High School
 Westport North School

 
Populated places in the West Coast, New Zealand
Buller District
Mining communities in New Zealand